Ellie Boatman (born 13 May 1997) is an English rugby union player.

Boatman started playing rugby aged four in  Camberley. From the age of 11 she played junior rugby for London Irish, and after a brief hiatus from the sport, began playing again at the University of Southampton and for a local Hampshire side Trojans RFC. Boatman joined Wasps in 2020 following spells with Saracens and Richmond. International recognition with the England sevens followed and she was England’s highest try scorer in the Malaga and Seville sevens with nine tries. Boatman is set to play for Harlequins in the 2022/23 Premier 15’s season.

Boatman was selected to play for England at the 2022 Commonwealth Games in rugby sevens. She was named in the England squad for the 2022 Rugby World Cup Sevens – Women's tournament held in Cape Town, South Africa in September 2022.

References

 

1995 births
Living people
Female rugby union players
England women's international rugby union players
English female rugby union players
Alumni of the University of Southampton
21st-century English women